"Enamórame" is a song recorded and produced by Dominican singer Papi Sánchez, written by Levitt Policalpe and Robert José Léon de Sánchez. It is his debut single from his album Enamorame and was released in 2003 in the United States and reached number three on the Billboard Tropical Songs chart. At the 2004 Latin Billboard Music Awards, the song received a nomination for "Tropical Airplay Track of the Year by a New Artist". It enjoyed a commercial success in France where it was released late 2004 and reached number two for four weeks, spent 13 weeks in the top ten and earned a gold disc. As of August 2014, it was the 55th best-selling single of the 21st century in France, with 380,000 units sold. It was also a hit in Belgium, both in Flanders and Wallonia, where it peaked in the top ten. In 2013, the song was covered by Tropical Family under the name "Enamorame (Oui bébé)", sung by DJ Assad with vocals by Papi Sanchez and Luyanna. It was released digitally as promotional single in January 2014 and reached number 24 on the Belgian Ultratip Chart.

Track listings
 CD single
 "Enamórame" (radio mix) - 3:42
 "Enamórame" (miami remix) - 4:08

Charts

Weekly charts

Year-end charts

Certifications

References

2003 singles
Papi Sánchez songs
Spanish-language songs
2003 songs